Le Soleil de la Floride is a French-language newspaper in Florida for Francophones and tourists. Le Soleil de la Floride is published monthly from May to September and weekly from October to April. The newspaper has been published in Miami since 1983.

Distribution 
350,000 copies are sold in Florida, 100,000 in Quebec, in 35 numbers, giving around 13,000 copies by publication.

Notes and references

See also 
 List of French-language newspapers published in the United States

External links 
 

1983 establishments in Florida
Companies based in Miami
European American culture in Florida
French-Canadian culture in the United States
French-language newspapers published in the United States
Mass media in Miami
Non-English-language newspapers published in Florida
Publications established in 1983
Quebec diaspora